Turner County is a county in the U.S. state of South Dakota. As of the 2020 census, the population was 8,673. Its county seat is Parker. The county was established in 1871, and was named for Dakota Territory official John W. Turner.

Turner County is a part of the Sioux Falls, SD Metropolitan Statistical Area.

Geography
The terrain of Turner County consists of rolling hills, carved by gullies and drainages. The area is largely devoted to agriculture. The terrain slopes to the south and east; its highest point is along its west boundary line, at 1,578' (481m) ASL.

Major highways

  U.S. Highway 18
  U.S. Highway 81
  South Dakota Highway 19
  South Dakota Highway 44
  South Dakota Highway 46
 South Dakota Highway 19A

Adjacent counties

 Minnehaha County - northeast
 Lincoln County - east
 Clay County - southeast
 Yankton County - southwest
 Hutchinson County - west
 McCook County - northwest

Protected areas
 Miller Waterfowl Production Area
 Peterson Waterfowl Production Area
 Plucker Waterfowl Production Area

Lakes
 Mud Lake
 Swan Lake

Demographics

2000 census
As of the 2000 census, there were 8,849 people, 3,510 households, and 2,478 families in the county. The population density was 14 people per square mile (6/km2). There were 3,852 housing units at an average density of 6 per square mile (2/km2). The racial makeup of the county was 98.86% White, 0.15% Black or African American, 0.27% Native American, 0.17% Asian, 0.12% from other races, and 0.43% from two or more races. 0.41% of the population were Hispanic or Latino of any race.

There were 3,510 households, out of which 31.60% had children under the age of 18 living with them, 61.90% were married couples living together, 5.60% had a female householder with no husband present, and 29.40% were non-families. 26.50% of all households were made up of individuals, and 14.80% had someone living alone who was 65 years of age or older. The average household size was 2.46 and the average family size was 2.99.

The county population contained 25.80% under the age of 18, 6.20% from 18 to 24, 24.80% from 25 to 44, 22.80% from 45 to 64, and 20.40% who were 65 years of age or older. The median age was 40 years. For every 100 females, there were 97.20 males. For every 100 females age 18 and over, there were 93.90 males.

The median income for a household in the county was $36,059, and the median income for a family was $42,704. Males had a median income of $28,833 versus $20,075 for females. The per capita income for the county was $17,343. About 5.70% of families and 7.20% of the population were below the poverty line, including 6.30% of those under age 18 and 11.30% of those age 65 or over.

2010 census
As of the 2010 census, there were 8,347 people, 3,452 households, and 2,363 families in the county. The racial makeup of the county was 97.5% white, 0.8% American Indian, 0.2% black or African American, 0.2% Asian, 0.3% from other races, and 0.9% from two or more races. Those of Hispanic or Latino origin made up 1.3% of the population. In terms of ancestry, 47.7% were German, 18.4% were Norwegian, 11.3% were Danish, 9.4% were Irish, 8.5% were Dutch, and 2.7% were American.

Of the 3,452 households, 29.0% had children under the age of 18 living with them, 58.7% were married couples living together, 5.9% had a female householder with no husband present, 31.5% were non-families, and 27.4% of all households were made up of individuals. The average household size was 2.37 and the average family size was 2.87. The median age was 43.7 years.

The median income for a household in the county was $48,068 and the median income for a family was $57,881. Males had a median income of $37,622 versus $27,459 for females. The per capita income for the county was $22,871. About 4.7% of families and 7.7% of the population were below the poverty line, including 8.9% of those under age 18 and 9.1% of those age 65 or over.

Culture
Turner County hosts the oldest county fair in the Dakotas. It held its first fair on October 13–16, 1880. The Turner County Agriculture Society was organized in March 1880. Its stated purpose was to showcase the agricultural successes of the new county. The fair was held at various locations over the years, but has been at its current location east of Parker for well over half a century.

Communities

Cities

 Centerville
 Hurley
 Irene (partial)
 Marion
 Parker (county seat)
 Viborg

Towns

 Chancellor
 Davis
 Dolton
 Monroe

Census-designated place 

 Cameron Colony

Unincorporated communities
 Hooker
 Naomi
 Turkey Ridge

Townships

Brothersfield
Centerville
Childstown
Daneville
Dolton
Germantown
Home
Hurley
Marion
Middleton
Monroe
Norway
Parker
Rosefield
Salem
Spring Valley
Swan Lake
Turner

Politics
Turner County voters are reliably Republican. In no national election since 1932 has the county selected the Democratic Party candidate.

See also
 National Register of Historic Places listings in Turner County, South Dakota

External links
 Turner County Sheriff's Office

References

 
1871 establishments in Dakota Territory
Populated places established in 1871
Sioux Falls, South Dakota metropolitan area